Pisidia longicornis, the long-clawed porcelain crab, is a species  of porcelain crab that lives in the north-eastern Atlantic Ocean. It was first named by Carl Linnaeus in 1767, although the etymology remains unclear.

Description
Its colouration is variable, with most individuals being reddish or orange, but some having patches of pearly white, or even being entirely white. One cheliped (claw-bearing appendage) is usually larger than the other, although this difference is less pronounced in females than in males. The fifth pair of legs is reduced in size and may be difficult to see.

Distribution and ecology
Pisidia longicornis is found in the north-eastern Atlantic Ocean from Norway to Angola, and throughout the Mediterranean Sea. It lives under boulders and among bryozoan turfs, and may occasionally be found in fish markets among mussels and oysters.

It feeds by filtering suspended material from the sea water. Individuals from the intertidal zone tend to be larger than those from deeper water, which may be related to the greater churning of the sediment by the tide.

Life cycle
Females bear eggs from March to August around the British Isles, and from February to September in the Mediterranean Sea. Young Pisidia longicornis go through two zoeal (larval) stages before reaching the megalopa (post-larval) stage. The zoea larvae bear "exceptionally long" spines on the carapace, one directed forwards, and two directed backwards.

Taxonomy
Pisidia longicornis was first described in 1767 by Carl Linnaeus, originally under the name Porcellana longicornis, in the 12th edition of his Systema Naturae. The species was moved from the genus Porcellana by William Elford Leach when he established the genus Pisidia in 1820.

External links

Pisidia longicornis British Marine Life Study Society

References

Porcelain crabs
Crustaceans of the Atlantic Ocean
Crustaceans described in 1767
Taxa named by Carl Linnaeus